The 1997–98 Segunda Divisão de Honra season was the eighth season of the competition and the 64th season of recognised second-tier football in Portugal.

Overview
The league was contested by 18 teams with UD Leiria winning the championship and gaining promotion to the Primeira Liga along with SC Beira-Mar and FC Alverca. At the other end of the table Académico Viseu, SCU Torreense and Nacional Funchal were relegated to the Segunda Divisão.

League standings

Footnotes

External links
 Portugal 1997/98 - RSSSF (Jorge Santos, Jan Schoenmakers and Daniel Dalence)
 Portuguese II Liga 1997/1998 - footballzz.co.uk

Portuguese Second Division seasons
Port
2